Article Four may refer to the 4th article of any regulatory document, such as:

 Article 4 of the European Convention on Human Rights
 Article Four (political party), political party in Sicily, Italy
 Article Four of the United States Constitution
 Article 4 direction, a local restriction on development rights in the United Kingdom
 Article 4 of the Constitution of Kazakhstan
 Article 4 of the Anglo-Iraqi Treaty of 1930
 NATO Article 4